Doorstepping, or door-stepping, is an attempt to obtain an interview, or piece to camera, from a contributor without prior arrangement or agreement, typically by confronting them in a public space, such as outside their home, workplace, or courthouse.

References

Journalism terminology